Mike Boettcher (born 1954) is an American journalist and war correspondent. He is often embedded in Iraq and Afghanistan.  He is also a visiting professor at the University of Oklahoma. Reporting from Key West, Florida on June 1, 1980, about the Mariel boatlift, he was the first reporter to present a live satellite report from the United States on CNN (coming after Jay Bushinsky's live satellite report from Jerusalem).  His work has won a Peabody Award, six Emmys, and a National Headliner award.

Boettcher and his son Carlos produced the 2014 film documentary The Hornet's Nest, depicting their experiences while embedded with American troops in Afghanistan.

Boettcher is a native of Ponca City, Oklahoma and a graduate of the University of Oklahoma.

References

External links
Boettcher on CNN website
Mike Boettcher, Gaylord Visiting Professional Professor, University of Oklahoma

American television news anchors
American war correspondents
Living people
1954 births
People from Ponca City, Oklahoma
University of Oklahoma alumni